Gaelcholáiste Chéitinn is a gaelcholáiste (Irish language-medium second-level school) that teaches students from the Clonmel area in County Tipperary in Ireland. Part of the Central Technical Institute (CTI) on the Mall, the Gaelcholáiste is one of the CTI's three education identities (the others being the secondary school, Coláiste Chluain Meala, and CTI Senior College of Further Education), all three of which fall under the auspices of the Tipperary Education and Training Board (ETB).

History
Gaelcholáiste Chéitinn was named in reference to Irish poet Geoffrey Keating.

The Gaelcholáiste was established in September 2004 with a three-year probationary period. At its opening the GaelColáiste had 14 first-year pupils: thirteen boys and one girl. Eleven of these, including the girl, came from the local Gaelscoil. The remaining three pupils came from different primary schools in the area. At least one parent of eight of those fourteen pupils had been a past pupil of CTI. By 2006 the Gaelcholáiste had 26 students. It was officially opened in 2009, having at that time an enrollment of 95 students.

References

External links
 Gaelcholáiste Chéitinn Website

2004 establishments in Ireland
Educational institutions established in 2004
Education in County Tipperary
Gaelcholáiste
Irish-language schools and college